Terras may refer to:

Locations
Terras de Bouro, a municipality in Portugal
Terras Salgadas, a geographical feature in southeastern Cape Verde
Terras Bridge, a bridge in Cornwall, UK
Terras, Cornwall a hamlet in Cornwall, UK

Novels
Terras do Sem Fim, a Brazilian novel

People
Anthony Terras (born 1985), French sports shooter
Artur Terras (1901–1963), Estonian politician, former mayor of Tallinn (1941–1944)
Audrey Terras (born 1942), American mathematician
Melissa Terras, British scholar of digital humanities
Riho Terras (born 1967), Estonian military commander
Riho Terras (mathematician) (1939–2005), Estonian-American mathematician